Edson Alan Reséndez Sánchez (born 12 January 1996) is a Mexican professional footballer who plays as a goalkeeper for Cancún.

Honours
Monterrey
Liga MX: Apertura 2019
Copa MX: Apertura 2017
CONCACAF Champions League: 2019

Mexico Youth
CONCACAF U-17 Championship: 2013
FIFA U-17 World Cup runner-up: 2013
CONCACAF U-20 Championship: 2015

References

External links
 

Footballers from Sinaloa
1996 births
People from Guasave
Living people
Mexican footballers
Association football goalkeepers
2015 CONCACAF U-20 Championship players
Mexico under-20 international footballers
Liga MX players
Liga de Expansión MX players
C.F. Monterrey players
Cancún F.C. footballers
Raya2 Expansión players